Count Sergei Vasilievich Saltykov (c. 1726 – 1765) was a Russian officer (chamberlain) who became the first lover of Empress Catherine the Great after her arrival in Russia.

Life 
Saltykov was alleged to be the biological father of Catherine II's son, Paul I of Russia, and this was heavily implied in Catherine's memoirs. It was reported that Paul was "almost certainly the child of [Catherine's] lover." However, Paul greatly resembled his official father Peter III of Russia in character and appearance. There was very little in common between the pugnacious, stocky Paul and tall, handsome Sergei Saltykov. In her memoirs, though, Catherine noted the 
"ugliness" of Saltykov's brother.

The Saltykovs were an ancient boyar family which rivaled the Romanovs in prominence. Saltykov was also descended from several branches of the Rurikid and Gediminid dynasties through the female line as well as from Tatiana Feodorovna, the sister of the first Romanov tsar Michael I. Tsarina Praskovia, the mother of Empress Anna, also came from this clan, although her branch was only distantly related to the grandfather of Sergei.

Sergei's wife Matryona Balk was named after her grandmother Modesta Mons, and was the sister of Anna Mons and Willem Mons. Modesta (better known under her Russian name Matryona) had been publicly whipped in 1718 and exiled to Siberia after Peter the Great had learnt about her brother Willem's affair with his wife Catherine.

References

External links 
Icons of Power: Empress of Ambition Catherine the Great

1720s births
1765 deaths

Year of birth uncertain
Russian nobility
Lovers of Catherine the Great
18th-century people from the Russian Empire
Ambassadors of the Russian Empire to France